The 2020 Asian Men's Handball Championship was the 19th edition of the championship held under the aegis of Asian Handball Federation in Kuwait City, Kuwait from 16 to 27 January 2020. It acted as the Asian qualifying tournament for the 2021 World Men's Handball Championship.

Qatar won their fourth consecutive title by defeating South Korea 33–21 in the final.

Venues

Draw
The draw was held on 2 November 2019 in the Millennium Hotel & Convention Centre, Salmiya, Kuwait.

Seeding
Teams were seeded according to the AHF COC regulations and rankings of the previous edition of the championship. Teams who had not participate in the previous edition were in Pot 4.

Referees
The following nine referee pairs were selected by Asian Handball Federation and International Handball Federation for the championship.

Preliminary round
All times are local (UTC+3).

Group A

Group B

Group C

Group D

Placement round
Group 3

Main round
Group 1

Group 2

Final round
Bracket

Semifinals

Seventh place game

Fifth place game

Third place game

Final

Final ranking

Awards
The all-star team and MVP were announced on 30 January 2020.

Top goalscorers

References

External links
AHF website
البطولة الآسيوية 19 لكرة اليد – kooora.com''
Results at todor66

2020
Asian Men's Handball Championship
Asian Men's Handball Championship
2020 Handball Asian Men's Championship
Asian Men's Handball